Adventist Health is a faith-based, nonprofit integrated health system serving more than 80 communities on the West Coast and in Hawaii. Founded on Seventh-day Adventist heritage and values, Adventist Health provides care in hospitals, clinics, home care agencies, hospice agencies and joint-venture retirement centers in both rural and urban communities.

Its headquarters are in Roseville, California. As of 2020 Adventist Health operates 22 hospitals in California, Hawaii, and Oregon.

History
In the 1960s, the General Conference transferred ownership of the hospitals in the United States to the local conferences. In 1972, the General Conference centralized the management of its healthcare facilities, creating Adventist Health Systems. The conferences then transferred the hospitals to the system, creating the entities Northwest Medical Foundation, and Adventist Health Services at the union level.

In 1980, they merged creating Adventist Health System/West, which changed its name to Adventist Health in 1995. The headquarters for Adventist Health was in Los Angeles, Adventist Health worried about the smaller hospitals being neglected, so the headquarters was moved to Roseville, California in 1982. In 2019 a new Roseville shared service center replaced the corporate office that opened in 1985.

Hospitals 
Adventist Health operates twenty-three hospitals mostly in California:

At a Glance 
In 2021, Adventist Health had 127,703 admissions, 682,364 emergency visits, 1,592,649 outpatient visits, 246,579 home visits, and 2,385,075 clinic visits.

See also

Other North American based Seventh-day Adventist healthcare operations:
 Adventist Health International
 AdventHealth
 Adventist Healthcare
 Adventist Health Studies
 Kettering Health
 Loma Linda University Medical Center

References

External links 
 

 
Hospital networks in the United States
Companies based in Roseville, California
Medical and health organizations based in California
Non-profit organizations based in California
Adventist organizations established in the 20th century